Richard Bovet (born c. 1641) was an English author of the 17th century who wrote Pandaemonium, or the Devil's Cloister (1684), a book on demonology.

Bovet was virulently anti-Catholic, and his book often equates Catholicism with witchcraft.  His work was influenced by that of Joseph Glanvill and Henry More.

References

Demonologists
English religious writers
Year of birth missing
Year of death missing
Witchcraft in England